Anita Schug M.D. is a Rohingya neurosurgeon and human rights activist based in Solothurn, Switzerland. At the age of five she fled Myanmar with her family, learned medicine in Ukraine and is a co-founder of the Rohingya Medics Organisation.

Early life 
Schug was born in Rangoon, Myanmar. Doctors refused care to her mother at the hospital when giving birth because her family is Rohingya Muslim. Her father was a chemical engineer.

In the 1980s, when Anita Schug was five years old, her family fled Myanmar for Bangladesh, having paid people smugglers.

Her family then moved to Pakistan, to the United Arab Emirates and then to Ukraine, where Schug studied medicine. She speaks eight languages.

Career 
Schug was the head of Women and Children Affairs for the European Rohingya Council and is the co-founder of the Rohingya Medics Organisation.

In 2017 she spoke of the thousands of Rohingya women killed in Rakhine state and confirmed reports of violence against Rohingya refugees in Bangladesh.

In September 2017, Schug called the violence in Myanmar "a slow burning genocide".

In 2018, she spoke about the widespread sexual abuse of Rohingya women in Buthidaung prison, Myanmar.

In 2020, Schug spoke of the practical difficulties of following World Health Organization advice for social distancing for those who lived in crowded refugee camps, and called for faster distribution of food to refugees.

Family 
Schug has two sisters who are also both doctors. She has two children and is married to a German trauma surgeon.

References

External links 

 Rohingya Medics Organisation, official website
 European Rohingya Council, official website
 

Rohingya diaspora
Stateless people
Emigrants
Women neurosurgeons
Living people
Refugees
Rohingya people
Rohingya conflict
Year of birth missing (living people)